Michaela Floeth (born 5 April 1969) is a former para-athlete from Germany who competed predominantly in F44 category shot put events.

At the 2008 Summer Paralympics in Beijing, China, she won a bronze medal in the Women's shot put F42–46 event. She also finished fourth in the women's discus throw F42-46 event.

Floeth won a gold medal at the 2011 IPC Athletics World Championships in the Women's shot put F42/44/46 event.

At the 2012 Summer Paralympics, she won a bronze medal in the women's shot put F42–44 event.

References

External links
 

1969 births
Living people
German female shot putters
Paralympic athletes of Germany
Paralympic medalists in athletics (track and field)
Paralympic bronze medalists for Germany
Athletes (track and field) at the 2008 Summer Paralympics
Athletes (track and field) at the 2012 Summer Paralympics
Medalists at the 2008 Summer Paralympics
Medalists at the 2012 Summer Paralympics
21st-century German women